The (International) Radiotelephony Spelling Alphabet, commonly known as the NATO phonetic alphabet, is the most widely used set of clear code words for communicating the letters of the Roman alphabet. Technically a radiotelephonic spelling alphabet, it goes by various names, including NATO spelling alphabet, ICAO phonetic alphabet and ICAO spelling alphabet. The ITU phonetic alphabet and figure code is a rarely used variant that differs in the code words for digits.

To create the code, a series of international agencies assigned 26 code words acrophonically to the letters of the Roman alphabet, with the intention of the letters and numbers being easily distinguishable from one another over radio and telephone, regardless of language barriers and connection quality. The specific code words varied, as some seemingly distinct words were found to be ineffective in real-life conditions. In 1956, NATO modified the then-current set of code words used by the International Civil Aviation Organization (ICAO); this modification then became the international standard when it was accepted by ICAO that year and by the International Telecommunication Union (ITU) a few years later. The words were chosen to be accessible to speakers of English, French and Spanish.

Although spelling alphabets are commonly called "phonetic alphabets", they should not be confused with phonetic transcription systems such as the International Phonetic Alphabet.

The 26 code words are as follows (ICAO spellings): , Bravo, Charlie, Delta, Echo, Foxtrot, Golf, Hotel, India, Kilo, Lima, Mike, November, Oscar, Papa, Quebec, Romeo, Sierra, Tango, Uniform, Victor, Whiskey, X-ray, Yankee, Zulu. "Alfa" and "Juliett" are intentionally spelled as such to avoid mispronunciation; NATO would do the same with "Xray".  Numbers are spoken as English digits, but with the pronunciations of three, four, five, nine, and thousand modified. 

The code words are fairly stable. A 1955 NATO memo stated that:

International adoption
Soon after the code words were developed by ICAO (see history below), they were adopted by other national and international organizations, including the ITU, the International Maritime Organization (IMO), the United States Federal Government as Federal Standard 1037C: Glossary of Telecommunications Terms and its successors ANSI T1.523-2001 and ATIS Telecom Glossary (ATIS-0100523.2019) (all three using the spellings "Alpha" and "Juliet"), the United States Department of Defense, the Federal Aviation Administration (FAA) (using the spelling "Xray"), the International Amateur Radio Union (IARU), the American Radio Relay League (ARRL), the Association of Public-Safety Communications Officials-International (APCO), and by many military organizations such as NATO (using the spelling "Xray") and the now-defunct Southeast Asia Treaty Organization (SEATO).

The same alphabetic code words are used by all agencies, but each agency chooses one of two different sets of numeric code words. NATO uses the regular English numeric words (zero, one, two &c., though with some differences in pronunciation), whereas the ITU (beginning on 1 April 1969) and the IMO define compound numeric words (nadazero, unaone, bissotwo &c.). In practice these are used very rarely, as they are not held in common between agencies.

Usage

A spelling alphabet is used to spell parts of a message containing letters and numbers to avoid confusion, because many letters sound similar, for instance "n" and "m" or "f" and "s"; the potential for confusion increases if static or other interference is present. For instance the message "proceed to map grid DH98" could be transmitted as "proceed to map grid Delta-Hotel-Niner-Ait". Using "Delta" instead of "D" avoids confusion between "DH98" and "BH98" or "TH98". The unusual pronunciation of certain numbers was designed to reduce confusion as well.

In addition to the traditional military usage, civilian industry uses the alphabet to avoid similar problems in the transmission of messages by telephone systems.  For example, it is often used in the retail industry where customer or site details are spoken by telephone (to authorize a credit agreement or confirm stock codes), although ad-hoc coding is often used in that instance. It has been used often by information technology workers to communicate serial or reference codes (which are often very long) or other specialised information by voice. Most major airlines use the alphabet to communicate passenger name records (PNRs) internally, and in some cases, with customers. It is often used in a medical context as well, to avoid confusion when transmitting information.

Several letter codes and abbreviations using the spelling alphabet have become well-known, such as Bravo Zulu (letter code BZ) for "well done", Checkpoint Charlie (Checkpoint C) in Berlin, and Zulu Time for Greenwich Mean Time or Coordinated Universal Time. During the Vietnam War, the U.S. government referred to the Viet Cong guerrillas and the group itself as VC, or Victor Charlie; the name "Charlie" became synonymous with this force.

Pronunciation of code words

The final choice of code words for the letters of the alphabet and for the digits was made after hundreds of thousands of comprehension tests involving 31 nationalities. The qualifying feature was the likelihood of a code word being understood in the context of others. For example, Football has a higher chance of being understood than Foxtrot in isolation, but Foxtrot is superior in extended communication.

Pronunciations were set out by the ICAO before 1956 with advice from the governments of both the United States and United Kingdom. To eliminate national variations in pronunciation, posters illustrating the pronunciation desired by ICAO are available. However, there remain differences in the pronunciations published by ICAO and other agencies, and ICAO has apparently conflicting Latin-alphabet and IPA transcriptions. At least some of these differences appear to be typographic errors. In 2022 the Deutsches Institut für Normung  (DIN) attempted to resolve these conflicts. 

Just as words are spelled out as individual letters, numbers are spelled out as individual digits. That is, 17 is rendered as "one seven" and 60 as "six zero", though thousand is also used, and for whole hundreds (when the sequence 00 occurs at the end of a number), the word hundred may be used. That is, 1300 may be read as "one three zero zero" (e.g. as a transponder code) or as "one thousand three hundred" (e.g. as an altitude or distance).

The ICAO, NATO, and FAA use modifications of English digits as code words, with 3, 4, 5 and 9 being pronounced tree, fower (rhymes with lower), fife and niner. The digit 3 is specified as tree so that it is not pronounced sri; the long pronunciation of 4 (still found in some English dialects) keeps it somewhat distinct from for; 5 is pronounced with a second "f" because the normal pronunciation with a "v" is easily confused with "fire" (a command to shoot); and 9 has an extra "r" to keep it distinct from the German word nein "no". (Prior to 1956, three and five had been pronounced with the English consonants, but as two syllables.) 
For direction presented as the hour-hand position on a clock, "ten", "eleven" and "twelve" may be used with "o'clock".

The ITU and IMO, however, specify a different set of code words. These are compounds of the ICAO words with a Latinesque prefix. 
The IMO's GMDSS procedures permits the use of either set of code words.

Tables
There are two IPA transcriptions of the letter names, from the International Civil Aviation Organization (ICAO) and the Deutsches Institut für Normung (DIN). Both authorities indicate that a non-rhotic pronunciation is standard. That of the ICAO, first published in 1950 and reprinted many times without correction (vd. the error in 'golf'), uses a large number of vowels. For instance, it has six low/central vowels: . The DIN consolidated all six into the single low-central vowel . The DIN also reduced the number of stressed syllables in bravo and x-ray, consistent with the ICAO English respellings of those words and with the NATO change of spelling of x-ray to xray so that people would know to pronounce it as a single word.

There is no authoritative IPA transcription of the digits. However, there are respellings into both English and French, which can be compared to clarify some of the ambiguities and inconsistencies. 

CCEB code words for punctuation include: 

Others are: 'colon', 'semi-colon', 'exclamation mark', 'question mark', 'apostrophe', 'quote' and 'unquote'.

History
Prior to World War I and the development and widespread adoption of two-way radio that supported voice, telephone spelling alphabets were developed to improve communication on low-quality and long-distance telephone circuits.

The first non-military internationally recognized spelling alphabet was adopted by the CCIR (predecessor of the ITU) during 1927. The experience gained with that alphabet resulted in several changes being made during 1932 by the ITU. The resulting alphabet was adopted by the International Commission for Air Navigation, the predecessor of the ICAO, and was used for civil aviation until World War II. It continued to be used by the IMO until 1965.

Throughout World War II, many nations used their own versions of a spelling alphabet. The U.S. adopted the Joint Army/Navy radiotelephony alphabet during 1941 to standardize systems among all branches of its armed forces. The U.S. alphabet became known as Able Baker after the words for A and B. The Royal Air Force adopted one similar to the United States one during World War II as well. Other British forces adopted the RAF radio alphabet, which is similar to the phonetic alphabet used by the Royal Navy during World War I. At least two of the terms are sometimes still used by UK civilians to spell words over the phone, namely F for Freddie and S for Sugar.

To enable the U.S., UK, and Australian armed forces to communicate during joint operations, in 1943 the CCB (Combined Communications Board; the combination of US and UK upper military commands) modified the U.S. military's Joint Army/Navy alphabet for use by all three nations, with the result being called the US-UK spelling alphabet. It was defined in one or more of CCBP-1: Combined Amphibious Communications Instructions, CCBP3: Combined Radiotelephone (R/T) Procedure, and CCBP-7: Combined Communication Instructions. The CCB alphabet itself was based on the U.S. Joint Army/Navy spelling alphabet. The CCBP (Combined Communications Board Publications) documents contain material formerly published in U.S. Army Field Manuals in the 24-series. Several of these documents had revisions, and were renamed. For instance, CCBP3-2 was the second edition of CCBP3.

During World War II, the U.S. military conducted significant research into spelling alphabets. Major F. D. Handy, directorate of Communications in the Army Air Force (and a member of the working committee of the Combined Communications Board), enlisted the help of Harvard University's Psycho-Acoustic Laboratory, asking them to determine the most successful word for each letter when using "military interphones in the intense noise encountered in modern warfare.". He included lists from the US, Royal Air Force, Royal Navy, British Army, AT&T, Western Union, RCA Communications, and that of the International Telecommunications Convention. According to a report on the subject:

After World War II, with many aircraft and ground personnel from the allied armed forces, "Able Baker" was officially adopted for use in international aviation. During the 1946 Second Session of the ICAO Communications Division, the organization adopted the so-called "Able Baker" alphabet that was the 1943 US–UK spelling alphabet. However, many sounds were unique to English, so an alternative "Ana Brazil" alphabet was used in Latin America. In spite of this, International Air Transport Association (IATA), recognizing the need for a single universal alphabet, presented a draft alphabet to the ICAO during 1947 that had sounds common to English, French, Spanish and Portuguese.

From 1948 to 1949, Jean-Paul Vinay, a professor of linguistics at the Université de Montréal worked closely with the ICAO to research and develop a new spelling alphabet. The directions of ICAO were that "To be considered, a word must:
 Be a live word in each of the three working languages.
 Be easily pronounced and recognized by airmen of all languages.
 Have good radio transmission and readability characteristics.
 Have a similar spelling in at least English, French, and Spanish, and the initial letter must be the letter the word identifies.
 Be free from any association with objectionable meanings."

Problems were soon found with this list. Some users believed that they were so severe that they reverted to the old "Able Baker" alphabet. Confusion among words like Delta and Extra, and between Nectar and Victor, or the poor intelligibility of other words during poor receiving conditions were the main problems. Later in 1952, ICAO decided to revisit the alphabet and their research. To identify the deficiencies of the new alphabet, testing was conducted among speakers from 31 nations, principally by the governments of the United Kingdom and the United States. In the United States, the research was conducted by the USAF-directed Operational Applications Laboratory (AFCRC, ARDC), to monitor a project with the Research Foundation of Ohio State University. Among the more interesting of the research findings was that "higher noise levels do not create confusion, but do intensify those confusions already inherent between the words in question".

By early 1956 the ICAO was nearly complete with this research, and published the new official phonetic alphabet in order to account for discrepancies that might arise in communications as a result of multiple alphabet naming systems coexisting in different places and organizations. NATO was in the process of adopting the ICAO spelling alphabet, and apparently felt enough urgency that it adopted the proposed new alphabet with changes based on NATO's own research, to become effective on 1 January 1956, but quickly issued a new directive on 1 March 1956 adopting the now official ICAO spelling alphabet, which had changed by one word (November) from NATO's earlier request to ICAO to modify a few words based on U.S. Air Force research.

After all of the above study, only the five words representing the letters C, M, N, U, and X were replaced. The ICAO sent a recording of the new Radiotelephony Spelling Alphabet to all member states in November 1955. Because the ITU governs all international radio communications, it was also adopted by most radio operators, whether military, civilian, or amateur. It was finally adopted by the IMO in 1965.

During 1947 the ITU adopted the compound Latinate prefix-number words (Nadazero, Unaone, etc.), later adopted by the IMO during 1965.
 Nadazero - from Spanish or Portuguese nada + NATO/ICAO zero  
 Unaone - generic Romance una, from Latin ūna + NATO/ICAO one
 Bissotwo - from Latin bis + NATO/ICAO two.  (1959 ITU proposals bis and too)
 Terrathree - from Italian terzo + NATO/ICAO three ("tree") (1959 ITU proposals ter and tree)
 Kartefour - from French quatre (Latin quartus) + NATO/ICAO four ("fow-er") (1959 ITU proposals quarto and fow-er)
 Pantafive - from French penta- + NATO/ICAO five ("fife") (From 1959 ITU proposals penta and fife)
 Soxisix - from French soix + NATO/ICAO six (1959 ITU proposals were saxo and six)
 Setteseven -  from Italian sette + NATO/ICAO seven (1959 ITU proposals sette and sev-en)
 Oktoeight -  generic Romance octo-, from Latin octō  + NATO/ICAO eight (1959 ITU proposals octo and ait)
 Novenine - from Italian nove + NATO/ICAO nine ("niner") (1959 ITU proposals were nona and niner)

In the official version of the alphabet, two spellings deviate from the English norm: Alfa and Juliett. Alfa is spelled with an f as it is in most European languages because the spelling Alpha may not be pronounced properly by native speakers of some languages – who may not know that ph should be pronounced as f. The spelling Juliett is used rather than Juliet for the benefit of French speakers, because they may otherwise treat a single final t as silent. For similar reasons, Charlie and Uniform have alternative pronunciations where the ch is pronounced "sh" and the u is pronounced "oo". Early on, the NATO alliance changed X-ray to Xray in its version of the alphabet to ensure that it would be pronounced as one word rather than as two, while the global organization ICAO keeps the spelling X-ray.

The alphabet is defined by various international conventions on radio, including:
 Universal Electrical Communications Union (UECU), Washington, D.C., December 1920
 International Radiotelegraph Convention, Washington, 1927 (which created the CCIR)
 General Radiocommunication and Additional Regulations (Madrid, 1932)
 Instructions for the International Telephone Service, 1932 (ITU-T E.141; withdrawn in 1993)
 General Radiocommunication Regulations and Additional Radiocommunication Regulations (Cairo, 1938)
 Radio Regulations and Additional Radio Regulations (Atlantic City, 1947), where "it was decided that the International Civil Aviation Organization and other international aeronautical organizations would assume the responsibility for procedures and regulations related to aeronautical communication. However, ITU would continue to maintain general procedures regarding distress signals."
 1959 Administrative Radio Conference (Geneva, 1959)
 International Telecommunication Union, Radio
 Final Acts of WARC-79 (Geneva, 1979). Here the alphabet was formally named "Phonetic Alphabet and Figure Code".
 International Code of Signals for Visual, Sound, and Radio Communications, United States Edition, 1969 (revised 2003)

Tables

For the 1938 and 1947 phonetics, each transmission of figures is preceded and followed by the words "as a number" spoken twice.

The ITU adopted the IMO phonetic spelling alphabet in 1959, and in 1969 specified that it be "for application in the maritime mobile service only".

Pronunciation was not defined prior to 1959. For the post-1959 phonetics, the underlined syllable of each letter word should be emphasized, and each syllable of the code words for the post-1969 figures should be equally emphasized.

International aviation 

The Radiotelephony Spelling Alphabet is used by the International Civil Aviation Organization for international aircraft communications.

International maritime mobile service 

The ITU-R Radiotelephony Alphabet is used by the International Maritime Organization for international marine communications.

Variants
Since 'Nectar' was changed to 'November' in 1956, the code has been mostly stable. However, there is occasional regional substitution of a few code words, such as replacing them with earlier variants, because of local taboos or confusing them with local terminology.
As of 2013, it was reported that "Delta" was often replaced by "David" or "Dixie" at Atlanta International Airport, where Delta Air Lines is based, because "Delta" is also the airline's callsign. Air traffic control once referred to Taxiway D at the same airport as "Taxiway Dixie", though this practice was officially discontinued in 2020.

See also
 International Code of Signals
 Spelling alphabet
 Allied military phonetic spelling alphabets
 APCO radiotelephony spelling alphabet (used by some US police departments)
 Language-specific spelling alphabets
 Finnish Armed Forces radio alphabet
 German spelling alphabet
 Greek spelling alphabet
 Japanese radiotelephony alphabet
 Korean spelling alphabet
 Russian spelling alphabet
 Swedish Armed Forces radio alphabet
 Radiotelephony procedure
 Procedure word
 Brevity code
 Ten-code
 Q code
 List of military time zones
 PGP word list

Notes

References

External links

 
 

Amateur radio
International Civil Aviation Organization
General aviation
History of air traffic control
Latin-script representations
Military communications
NATO standardisation
Spelling alphabets
Telecommunications-related introductions in 1956

de:Buchstabiertafel#Internationale Buchstabiertafel